Eudocima serpentifera is a species of fruit-piercing moth in the family Erebidae first described by Francis Walker in 1858. It is found in North America.

The MONA or Hodges number for Eudocima serpentifera is 8543.1.

References

Further reading

External links

 

Eudocima
Articles created by Qbugbot
Moths described in 1858